Yevheniy Shevchenko may refer to:
 Yevheniy Shevchenko (footballer)
 Yevheniy Shevchenko (politician)